Ritwik Roy Chowdhury (born 20 November 1995) is an Indian cricketer. He plays Twenty20 cricket for Bengal. He made his List A debut on 7 October 2019, for Bengal in the 2019–20 Vijay Hazare Trophy. He made his first-class debut on 3 January 2020, for Bengal in the 2019–20 Ranji Trophy.

See also
 List of Bengal cricketers

References

External links
 

1995 births
Living people
Indian cricketers
Bengal cricketers
Cricketers from Kolkata